Sachin Mohan (born 4 October 1990) is an Indian cricketer who represents Kerala in domestic cricket.  He is a left-handed opening batsman and right-arm offspinner who has played for Kerala in all junior state formats as well as Ranji Trophy, Vijay Hazare Trophy and Syed Musthaq Ali as well. Hailing from Trivandrum, he was a prolific run scorer for the state in age group categories and is well known for his slip catching.

References

1990 births
Indian cricketers
Living people